Buzhardt is a surname. Notable people with the surname include:

J. Fred Buzhardt (1924–1978), American attorney and public servant
John Buzhardt (1936–2008), American baseball player